Pammene fasciana, the chestnut leafroller, is a moth of the family Tortricidae. It is found in Europe and across the Palearctic.

The chestnut leafroller has an average wingspan between 13–17 mm. The forewing has a wide, slanted white cross-band that can be blurry in the foremost part. In newly hatched specimens, the white ribbon has a pink tinge, and the wing has bluish metallic spots and cross-bands, but this is less evident on worn specimens. Adults are on wing from June to July in western Europe.

The larvae feed on Castanea, Fagus and Quercus species. It is considered a serious pest on sweet chestnut (Castanea sativa). The larvae feed internally in the acorns or nuts of the host plant.

External links
 
 Species info
 UKMoths
 lepiforum.de

Olethreutinae
Moths described in 1761
Moths of Europe
Moths of Asia
Taxa named by Carl Linnaeus